The Arizona Southern Baptist Convention (ASBC) is an autonomous association of Baptist churches in the state of Arizona. It is one of the state conventions associated with the Southern Baptist Convention.

History
The ASBC was officially formed in 1928 but its origins lie some years earlier when the division between the Arizona Baptist Convention and the Northern Baptist Convention — particularly in respect to segregation and other racial issues — created the same unbridgeable divide that slavery had caused between the ASBC and the NBC in the mid 19th century. By March 1917, a group of Baptists who objected to the northern positions on segregation and the intermingling of racial groups decided to leave the First Baptist Church of Phoenix and form the Calvary Baptist Church of Phoenix. That year, C. M. Rock, an ASBC pastor from Asheville, North Carolina was sent to help establish the ASBC’s presence in Arizona.  On March 27, 1921, with Rock as their pastor, a group of people left the Calvary Baptist Church to form the First Southern Baptist Church, as a protest against the Northern Convention's stances on open communion, alien immersion, and interdenominational comity.  In August of the same year, this new church joined the Southwestern Baptist Association of New Mexico.

On September 21, 1928, Rock led the formation of the Baptist General Convention of Arizona.  In May 1929, this was associated with the Southern Baptist Convention.  It retained the name Baptist General Convention of Arizona until 1961, when it changed its name to the Arizona Southern Baptist Convention.

As of 2010 there were 404 Southern Baptist congregations in Arizona, with 126,830 adherents; this is the third most congregations of all religious body in the state, fourth most adherents, and 27th by average adherents per congregation.

Affiliated Organizations 
Arizona Baptist Children's Services
Arizona Campus of Gateway Seminary
Arizona Christian Challenge
Arizona Woman's Missionary Union
Historical Commission, AZSBC

Further reading

See also 
 Baptist Foundation of Arizona

References

External links
 

Christian organizations established in 1928
Baptist Christianity in Arizona
Conventions associated with the Southern Baptist Convention
Baptist denominations established in the 20th century
1928 establishments in Arizona